Ona Batlle Pascual (born 10 June 1999) is a Spanish professional footballer who plays as a full-back for English Women's Super League club Manchester United and the Spain national team.

Club career

Youth career
Ona Batlle Pascual was born on 10 June 1999 in Vilassar de Mar, a town in the province of Barcelona, and started to play football with Vilassar de Mar. In 2011, she was scouted by FC Barcelona during a match with the Catalonia under-12 team. She joined FC Barcelona's youth program La Masia and progressed through the ranks, earning promotion to Barcelona B, Barcelona's highest-level youth team which played in the Segunda División, in 2014. On 9 November 2016, Batlle was called up to the first team and was an unused substitute in Barcelona's Champions League game against FC Twente.

In the summer of 2017, Barcelona changed focus to recruiting high-profile senior players, making it more difficult for youth players to break through to the first team. Batlle was one of seven La Masia players to leave in the summer to pursue senior first-team opportunities with other clubs. On her departure, Batlle remarked she will not rule out a return to the club that "formed her."

Madrid CFF
Batlle signed to Madrid CFF in July 2017, the club's first signing following their promotion to the Primera División. She made her senior debut during the club's first Primera División match, as a halftime substitute for Laura del Río in a 1–1 draw with Levante. Batlle cemented her place as a starter during the season, playing in 28 of the 30 league matches including 26 starts as Madrid CFF ended their first Primera División campaign mid-table in tenth place.

Levante
After one season with Madrid, Batlle signed with Levante in June 2018. However, prior to the start of the season Batlle suffered an injury at the FIFA U-20 World Cup in August, delaying her debut for the club. She eventually made her first Levante appearance as a substitute in a 3–2 win away to former club Madrid CFF on 5 December 2018. Batlle scored her first Primera División goal in a 4–2 win over Logroño on 22 December 2018. On 24 June 2020, Batlle released a statement that she was not going to renew her contract with Levante and would instead become a free agent. She remained as one of 17 players in a class action lawsuit against the Association of Women's Football Clubs (ACFF) and the Association of Spanish Football Players (AFE) at the time, disputing the use of the Compensation List that would inflate the fee necessary for other Primera División to sign allocated players as free agents. Batlle's compensation was set at €500,000.

Manchester United
On 13 July 2020, Batlle signed a two-year contract with an option for a third with English FA WSL club Manchester United. She made her debut on 6 September 2020, starting in the season opener as United drew 1–1 with defending champions Chelsea. In total, Batlle appeared in 23 of United's 27 games during the season and was named Women's Player of the Year at the end of the campaign. In the first league game of the 2021–22 season, Batlle scored her first goal for the club in a 2–0 win against Reading. She made 21 league appearances in the 2021–22 campaign and was recognised with PFA Team of the Year honours.

International career

Youth
Batlle has represented Spain at under-17, under-19 and under-20 level including at five major youth tournaments: two UEFA Women's Under-17 Championship editions (2015 and 2016), the 2016 FIFA U-17 Women's World Cup, the 2017 UEFA Women's Under-19 Championship and the 2018 FIFA U-20 Women's World Cup.

Spain won the 2015 UEFA Women's Under-17 Championship, beating Switzerland 5–2 in the final. Batlle started in four of the five games in the tournament. They finished as runners-up at the 2016 edition, losing to Germany on penalties in the final. Batlle started every game for Spain at the tournament. The result automatically qualifying Spain for the 2016 FIFA U-17 Women's World Cup. Batlle started five of the six games including all of the knockout round as Spain finished third, losing to Japan in the semi-finals before beating Venezuela in the third-place playoff.

In July 2017, Batlle was selected by Pedro López to represent Spain at the 2017 UEFA Women's Under-19 Championship. Spain won the tournament with a stoppage time goal from Patricia Guijarro against France. Batlle again started every game in the tournament and she was one of seven Spanish players selected to the team of the tournament. The result also qualified Spain for the 2018 FIFA U-20 Women's World Cup. Batlle only ended up playing one match at the World Cup, sustaining an injury against Paraguay in the opening match that ended her tournament. Teammate Patricia Guijarro dedicated her goal against the United States to Batlle by holding up her shirt to the camera and the fans. Spain finished as runners-up, losing 3–1 to Japan in the final.

Senior
On 17 May 2019, Batlle made her senior debut in a friendly against Cameroon, substituting in for Eunate Arraiza at halftime. She was left out of the 23-player roster for the 2019 FIFA Women's World Cup three days later.

In February 2020, Batlle was called up to Spain's squad for her first senior international tournament opportunity, the 2020 SheBelieves Cup. She started the first two matches of the tournament, a 3–1 win against Japan and a narrow 1–0 loss to the reigning World Champion United States as Spain finished second in their debut SheBelieves appearance.

Career statistics

Club
.

International
Statistics accurate as of match played 2 September 2022

Honours
Barcelona
Copa de la Reina: 2017

Spain Youth
UEFA Women's Under-17 Championship: 2015
UEFA Women's Under-17 Championship runner-up: 2016
FIFA U-17 Women's World Cup third-place: 2016
UEFA Women's Under-19 Championship: 2017
FIFA U-20 Women's World Cup runner-up: 2018

Individual
 UEFA Women's Under-17 Championship Team of the Tournament: 2016
UEFA Women's Under-19 Championship Team of the Tournament: 2017
Manchester United Women's Player of the Year: 2020–21
PFA WSL Team of the Year: 2021–22

References

External links
Profile at the Manchester United F.C. website

1999 births
Living people
People from Vilassar de Mar
Sportspeople from the Province of Barcelona
Sportswomen from Catalonia
Footballers from Catalonia
Spanish women's footballers
Women's association football fullbacks
FC Barcelona Femení B players
Madrid CFF players
Levante UD Femenino players
Manchester United W.F.C. players
Primera División (women) players
Spain women's youth international footballers
Spain women's international footballers
Spanish expatriate women's footballers
Spanish expatriate sportspeople in England
Expatriate women's footballers in England
UEFA Women's Euro 2022 players